Gruppa krovi ( Russian IPA: /ˈɡrupːə ˈkrovʲɪ/) is the sixth studio album by Soviet rock band Kino, first released in 1988. Released at the height of Perestroika and Glasnost, together with a crime thriller titled The Needle released in the same year starring lead vocalist Viktor Tsoi, it would go on to be the band's most popular album both inside and eventually outside the Soviet Union, with songs from the album, including the title track, commonly being listed among top 100 lists of Russian music.

Work on the creation began in 1987. Most of the recording took place with Georgy Guryanov, the work was completed at the studio of Alexei Vishnya. The sound of the recording is overstated compared to the albums, thanks to the use of a modern reverb in the studio.

The album was highly praised by critics upon release and continues to be considered a notable event in the history of Russian music. In 1999, Nashe Radio published list of "100 Best Songs of Russian Rock in the 20th Century", including several songs from this album and giving the song "Blood Type" the first place. In 2007, the editors of the Rolling Stone included the song "Blood Type" in their list of "40 songs that changed the world."

Background 
At the end of 1985, bass player Alexander Titov, who was also a member of the band Aquarium, left Kino as it became difficult for him to work in both bands, so Titov chose Aquarium. The musicians rarely commented on Titov's departure, considering it to be a betrayal to some extent. According to Kino drummer Georgy Guryanov, Titov did not fit into their team and always considered himself a member of the Aquarium, working with Tsoi's band only as a guest musician.

History
After the Soviet release, the album was released in the United States in 1989 by Capitol Records. The album's title song "Gruppa krovi", is about the constant selfless struggle for what is right as well as being anti-war anthem. At the request of a U.S. fan, the song was also translated and recorded in English as "Blood Type".

Album cover

Gruppa krovi’s album cover is reminiscent of the post-war Russian avant-garde and pre-war suprematist movements, and the art of artists such as El Lissitzky. It is directly inspired by the poster of the Russian release of Fritz Lang’s 1922 silent film Dr. Mabuse the Gambler.

Re-release
In 1989, Gold Castle Records released the album on CD, audio cassette, and vinyl in the U.S.
On 21 November 1989, Victor Musical Industries released the remastered album (with the 9th track "Prokhozhiy") on CD in Japan. 
In 1991, Russian Disc released the album on vinyl for the first time in the Soviet Union.
In 1993, General Records re-released the album on CD without digital remastering in Austria.
In 1995, MF Records, a label owned by Mikhail Fridman, re-released the album on CD without digital remastering in Germany.
In 1996, Moroz Records re-released the digitally remastered album (with the 9th track "Prokhozhiy") on CD and audio cassette.
In 2003, Moroz Records reissued the album as part of a box set collection containing 15 CDs.
In 2012, Moroz Records re-released the album on vinyl.
In 2019, Maschina Records restored the album from original mastertapes and released it on LP, CD and CS along with bonus material.

In popular culture
 "Gruppa krovi" was featured in Grand Theft Auto IVs soundtrack, but was removed in April 2018 after the ten-year license expired.
 American heavy metal band Metallica covered the title track “Gruppa krovi” live at a concert in Moscow's Luzhniki Stadium on July 21, 2019, twenty nine years and a day after the band had last performed there live before Tsoi's car accident later in 1990.
 A remix of "Gruppa krovi" was used by the Russian video game War Thunder in a trailer for the update "Drone Age".

Track listing 
 "Группа крови" / "Gruppa krovi" / "Blood Type" (4:45)
 "Закрой за мной дверь, я ухожу" / "Zakroy za mnoy dver', ya ukhozhu" / "Close the Door Behind Me, I'm Leaving" (4:15)
 "Война" / "Voyna" / "War" (4:04)
 "Спокойная ночь" / "Spokoynaya noch'" / "Peaceful Night" (6:07)
 "Мама, мы все сошли с ума" / "Mama, my vse soshli s uma" / "Mama, We've All Gone Mad" (4:06)
 "Бошетунмай" / "Boshetunmai" (4:09)
 "В наших глазах" / "V nashikh glazakh" / "In Our Eyes" (3:34)
 "Попробуй спеть вместе со мной" / "Poprobuy spet' vmeste so mnoy" / "Try to Sing Along With Me" (4:35)
 "Прохожий" / "Prokhozhiy" / "Passerby" – (3:39)
 "Дальше действовать будем мы" / "Dal'she deystvovat' budem my" / "From Now On, it's Our Turn" (3:55)
 "Легенда" / "Legenda" / "Legend" – (4:10)

Personnel
Viktor Tsoi – vocals, guitar
Yuri Kasparyan – lead guitar, keyboards 
Igor Tikhomirov – bass guitar
Georgiy Guryanov – Yamaha RX-11 drum machine, backing vocals, bass guitar 

Additional personnel
Andrei Sigle – keyboards
Igor Verichev – backing vocals 
Alexey Vishnya – mixing and mastering, backing vocals

References

 
 
 

Kino (band) albums
1988 albums
1988 in the Soviet Union
Soviet rock music
Anti-war songs